Udon Entertainment Corp. is a Canadian art studio and publisher. The company publishes original and translated comic books, graphic novels, manga and art books related to anime and video games. It was founded in 2000 and is named after udon, a kind of Japanese noodle.

Overview
It was affiliated with Studio XD; in March 2004, Udon announced a partnership to release comics under Devil's Due Publishing. Udon's first offering was the Street Fighter comic book series, launching in September 2003. They would add a Darkstalkers comic series to their line in November 2004. In October 2005, Udon reorganized its operations and became a full-fledged publisher. Erik Ko revealed that the lengthy break in the Summer of 2005 was to recover from a licensing deal with Capcom, which saw Udon doing artwork for Capcom Fighting Evolution. Although Udon appreciated the opportunity to work on the game and to strengthen their ties with the video game maker, it taxed their resources and left them behind schedule on their comics. In October 2005, Udon released Street Fighter II #0, the sequel to their Street Fighter comic; it was followed in early 2006 with the long-awaited launch of Rival Schools. Erik Ko discussed this in an interview with Newsarama that can be read here.

In December 2007 at the New York Anime Festival, Udon announced that it would be publishing three new Street Fighter comic book series in 2008. These include Street Fighter II Turbo (12-issue series), Street Fighter Legends: Chun-Li (4-issue mini), and Street Fighter III (6-issue series).

In November 2008, Udon announced it would publish a 4-issue mini-series of the upcoming Street Fighter IV game. “With the most anticipated Street Fighter game in years arriving 2009, we will be launching the ‘‘Street Fighter IV” comic series as a big crossover event with the game. That would mean the originally planned Street Fighter III series will have to make way and be released after this ‘‘Street Fighter IV” story arc is done,” said Ko. “We are working very closely with Capcom and the SFIV producer in Japan to make this comic series as exciting as possible. The stories from our comic are linked directly to the game, and it is a genuine extension that fans will definitely love. Also expect plenty of cross promotion and marketing between our comics and the game.”

In January 2009, Udon announced it had acquired the rights to produce Final Fight comic books. In November 2009, Udon announced it will continue the Darkstalkers comic series with a new 3-issue mini-series called Darkstalkers: The Night Warriors. In December 2009, Udon announced it would publish a four-issue Street Fighter Legends: Ibuki miniseries.

From 2012 to 2014, Udon partnered with Bandai Namco to produce several webcomics and webseries based on their various video game IP as part of their ShiftyLook initiative.

Publishing

Comic books

Capcom Comic Book Universe
The Capcom Comic Book Universe (CCBU) is a comic book franchise developed by Udon, which is based on various Capcom franchises set inside a shared universe.

Other comic books
Exalted #0-4 (2005−2006, based on the roleplaying game by White Wolf)
Cannon Busters #0-2 (2005−2006, creator-owned series by LeSean Thomas)

Imported titles

Art books

Anime & character art

Video games

Notes
Out of print.

Work for other companies

Video games
Full artwork for Super Street Fighter II Turbo HD Remix (Capcom), for Xbox Live Arcade and PlayStation Network
Character designs and illustrations for New International Track & Field (Konami), for Nintendo DS
Character designs and illustrations for Speed Racer (WB Games), for Nintendo DS, Wii and PlayStation 2
Artwork for Capcom Fighting Evolution (Capcom)
Artwork for Kongai on Kongregate
Artwork for the pack-in comic included with Namco's Soulcalibur IV Platinum Edition
Artwork for the pack-in comic included with Capcom's Street Fighter IV Collector's Edition
Artwork for Tatsunoko vs. Capcom: Ultimate All-Stars (Capcom), for Wii
Inks and Colours for the pack-in comic included with Midway Games' Mortal Kombat vs. DC Universe Kollector's Edition
Promotional artwork for the re-release of Marvel vs. Capcom 2: New Age of Heroes on Xbox Live Arcade and PlayStation Network
Promotional artwork for Marvel vs. Capcom 3: Fate of Two Worlds
Promotional Comic for Fire Emblem: The Sacred Stones

Comics
Agent X (Marvel Comics)
Marvel Mangaverse: Avengers Assemble (Marvel Comics)
Cable & Deadpool (Marvel Comics)
Deadpool (Marvel Comics)
Sentinel (Marvel Comics) 
Taskmaster (Marvel Comics) 
X-Men: Evolution (Marvel Comics) 
Last Shot (Marvel Comics) 
Vampi (Harris Comics)
XIN (Harris Comics) 
Robotech (Wildstorm)
Covers for the StarCraft and Warcraft manga (Tokyopop)

Misc
Character designs for DC's Ame-Comi Girls PVC statue line (DC Direct)
Epic Battles trading card game (Score Entertainment) 
Street Fighter UFS trading card game (Sabertooth Games) 
Darkstalkers UFS trading card game (Sabertooth Games)

References

External links

Udon Comics on Marvel.com

Comic book publishing companies of Canada
Comics studios
Manga distributors
Manhwa distributors
Canadian companies established in 2000
Publishing companies established in 2000
Companies based in Richmond Hill, Ontario